Diamond Platnumz is a Tanzanian recording artist, dancer, philanthropist and businessman.

On 3 May 2013, Diamond Platnumz set a new record at the Tanzania Music Awards by winning 7 awards, including Best Male Writer, Best Male Artist, Best Song Writer and Best Male Entertainer of the Year. The previous record was set by 20%, a recording artist who walked away with 5 awards at the 2011 Tanzania Music Awards where diamond left empty handed. Prior to accomplishments, Diamond held the record for winning 4 awards at the 2010 Tanzania Music Awards.

Afro X Digital Awards 

|-
|2021
|"Kamata"
|Music Video Of The Year 
|
|

WatsUp TV Africa Music Video Awards 

!Ref
|-
|rowspan="5"|2016
|rowspan="5"|"Kidogo"
|African Video of the Year
|
|
|-
|Best African Combo Video
|
|
|-
|Best African Performance
|
|
|-
|Best African Male Video
|
|
|-
|Best East African Video
|
|
|-

Channel O Music Video Awards 

|-
|rowspan="4"|2014
|rowspan="4"|"Number One"
|Most Gifted Newcomer
|
|-
|Most Gifted East
|
|-
|Most Gifted Afro Pop
|
|-
|Most Gifted Video of the Year
|

HiPipo Music Awards 

|-
|2015
|"Number One"
|East Africa Superhit
|
|-
|2016
|"Nana by Diamond Platnumz"
|East Africa Superhit
|
|-
|2016
|"Nana by Diamond Platnumz Ft Mr Flavour"
|East Africa Best Video 
|
|-
|2017
|"Diamond Platnumz"
| Quinquennial Africa Music Vanguard Award
|
|-
|2017
|"Salome by Diamond Platnumz ft Rayvanny"
| East Africa Best Video
|
|-
|2018
|"Marry You"
|Africa Song of the Year	
|
|-
|2018
|"Eneka"
|East Africa Best Video	
|

Top Ten Tube Music Awards 

|-
|2014
|"Diamond Platnumz"
|Best Artist East Africa
|

The Headies 

|-
|2014
|Himself
|African Artiste of the Year
|
|}

The Future Africa Awards 

|-
|2014
|Himself
|Prize in Entertainment
|

Nzumari Awards 

|-
|2012
|"Diamond"
|Best Male Artist – Tanzania
|

MTV Europe Music Awards 

|-
|2014
|rowspan="3"|Diamond
|rowspan="2"|Best African Act
|
|-
|rowspan="2"|2015
|
|-
|Best African and Indian Act
|
|-

MTV Africa Music Awards 

|-
|2010
|Diamond
|Best New Artist
|
|-
|rowspan="2"|2014
|Diamond
|Best Male
|
|-
|Diamond (featuring Davido)
|Best Collaboration
|
|-
|rowspan="3"|2015
|rowspan="3"|Diamond 
|Best Male
| 
|-
|Best Collaboration (BumBum Ft Iyanya)
|
|-
|Best Live Act 
|
|-
|rowspan=2|2016
|rowspan=2|Diamond
|Best Male Artist 
|
|-
|Artist of the year 
|

BET Awards 

|-
|2014
|Diamond
|Best International Act: Africa
|
|-
|2016
|Diamond
|Best International Act: Africa
|
|-
|2021
|Diamond
|Best International Act: Africa
|
|-

African Muzik Magazine Awards 

|-
|rowspan="5"|2014
|rowspan="2"|Himself
|Best Male East Africa
|
|-
|Artist of the Year
|
|-
|"Number One"
|Best Video of the Year
|
|-
|rowspan="2"|"Number One Remix"
|Best Collabo
|
|-
|Song of the Year
|
|-
|rowspan=7|2015
|Himself
|Best Male Artist East Africa
|
|-
|Nana
|Video of the year 
|
|-
|Himself
|Artist Of The Year
|
|-
|Alive with Bracket
|Afrimma Best Insipirational Song
|
|-
|Nana Ft Flavour N'abania
|Best Collaboration
|
|-
|Nana
|Best Dance Video
|
|-
|Nitampata Wapi
|Song Of The Year
|
|-
| rowspan="6" |2020
| rowspan="3" | Himself
|Best Male East Africa 
|
|-

Tanzania Music Awards 

|-
| rowspan="3"|2010
|Diamond
|Best Upcoming Artist 
|
|-
|rowspan="2"|"Kamwambie"
|Best Song
|
|-
|Best R&B Song
|
|-
|rowspan="4"|2011
|rowspan="4"|Diamond 
|Best Male Singer 
|
|-
|Best Male Artist 
|
|-
|Best Afro Pop Song "Mbagala"
|
|-
|Best Video "Mbagala"
|
|-
|rowspan="6"|2012
|rowspan="3"|Diamond
|Best Male Artist
|
|-
|Best Song Writer
|
|-
|Best Male Singer
|
|-
|rowspan=3|"Moyo Wangu"
|Best Music Video
|
|-
|Best Song of the year
|
|-
|Afro Pop Song of the Year
|
|-
|rowspan="2"|2013
|rowspan="2"|Diamond
|Best Male Artist
|
|-he is so powerful like no body
|Best Male Singer
|
|-
|rowspan="7"|2014
|rowspan="3"|Diamond
|Best Male Artist
|
|-
|Best Male Writer
|
|-
|Best Male Entertainer of the Year
|
|-
|"Muziki Gani" (Nay Wamitego featuring Diamond)
|Best Collaboration Song
|
|-
|rowspan="3"|"Number One"
|Best Afro Pop Song 
|
|-
|Best Music Video 
|
|-
|Song of the year
|
|-
|rowspan="8"|2015
|rowspan="3"|Diamond 
|Best Male Artist 
|
|-
|Best Male Performer
|
|-
|Songwriter of the Year 
|
|-
|rowspan="2"|Mdogo Mdogo 
|Afro Pop Song of the Year 
|
|-
|Video of the Year
| 
|-
|Nitampata Wapi
|Best Zouk/Rhumba Song 
|
|-
|Kerewa
|Best Collaboration
|
|-

People's Choice Awards 

|-
|2014
|My Number One
|Favourite Male Video
|
|-
|2015
|Diamond
|Favourite Male Artist
|
|-

AFRIMA

References 

Lists of awards received by Tanzanian musicians